Rex is an American indie rock band formed in 1994 (though an early version of the band was formed in 1991).  Rex was considered one of the most important and influential slowcore bands and released three albums and one EP on Southern Records, as well as a collaboration with Red Red Meat (under the name Loftus) on Perishable Records.  Members included Doug Scharin (who was also a member of Codeine, HiM, and June of 44), Curtis Harvey (Pullman), and Phil Spirito (Orso).

Discography

Albums
rex (1995)
rex C (1996)
3 (1997)

EPs
Waltz (1996)

Collaborations
Loftus (with Red Red Meat) (1999)

References

External links
rex
[ Rex at Allmusic]
Loftus at Perishable Records

Indie rock musical groups from New York (state)
Musical groups from Brooklyn
Sadcore and slowcore groups